Corydoras isbrueckeri is a tropical freshwater fish belonging to the Corydoradinae sub-family of the family Callichthyidae. It originates in inland waters in South America. Corydoras isbrueckeri is found in Bolivia.

The fish is named in honor of Isaäc J. H. Isbrücker (b. 1944), in honor of his 60th birthday, for building and maintaining the fish collection at Zoölogisch Museums Amsterdam, and for his many publications on the taxonomy of catfishes in the families Callichthyidae and Loricariidae.

References

Knaack, J., 2004. Beschreibung von sechs neuen Arten der Gattung Corydoras La Cépède, 1803 (Teleostei: Siluriformes: Callichthyidae). Zool. Abh., Staat. Mus. Tierk. Dresden 54:55-105. 

Corydoras
Catfish of South America
Fish of Bolivia
Taxa named by Joachim Knaack
Fish described in 2004